Hribi is a small settlement above Mahniči in the Municipality of Sežana in the Littoral region of Slovenia.

References

External links
Hribi on Geopedia

Populated places in the Municipality of Sežana